Adamov is a municipality and village in Kutná Hora District in the Central Bohemian Region of the Czech Republic. It has about 100 inhabitants.

Geography
It lies in the Upper Sázava Hills. It is situated on the left bank of the Brslenka Stream.

History
Adamov was founded by Count Jan Adam Auersperg in 1784 and named after him. It was built in the woods as one of the oldest Czech workers' colonies, and most of the houses were made of wood. The inhabitants of the village worked in the textile factory in Tupadly and in the winter they also cut wood.

Adamov was originally an administrative part of Bratčice. From 1960 to 1990, it was part of Tupadly. Since 1990, it has been a separate municipality.

Sights
Adamov is poor in cultural monuments. The oldest building in the village is the former inn No. 19, which is a building about 200 years old. There is also a small wooden belfry from 1919.

References

External links

Villages in Kutná Hora District